The China Folk Culture Village (深圳中国民俗文化村) is a part of Splendid China Folk Village in Shenzhen, China. It is located adjacent to the Splendid China theme park and features displays of the daily life and architecture of China's 56 ethnic groups. It was opened to the public in October 1991.

Villages

The park's recreated villages include the following:

Yi Village
Miao Village
Dong Village
Naxi Village
Buyi Village
Yao Village
Zhuang Village
Mosuo Village
Dai Village
Wa Village
Hani Village
Gaoshan Village
Bai Village
Li Village
Jingpo Village
Tibetan Nationality
Uyghur Nationality
Quadrate Yard
Mongolian Nationality
Korean Nationality
Cave-house in North Shaanxi
Tujia Village

Festivals
The China Folk Culture Village has featured several cultural festivals, including the Water Splashing Festival of the Dai, the Shawm Festival of the Miao, the Torch Festival of the Yi, the Huaxia Great Cultural Temple Fair, the Xinjiang Cultural Festival, and the Inner Mongolia Grassland Cultural Festival.

See also
China Nationalities Museum
Vietnam Museum of Ethnology
List of parks in Shenzhen

External links

Splendid China folk culture village review
Official website Splendid China

Amusement parks in Shenzhen
 
1991 establishments in China
Nanshan District, Shenzhen
Chinese folk culture
Folk museums in China